The Havenwelten (Harbour worlds) is a maritime-styled quarter in Bremerhaven. It includes the Atlantic Hotel Sail City , the Climate House® Bremerhaven 8° East, the shopping mall Mediterraneo, the Deutsches Schifffahrtsmuseum (German Shipping Museum), the Bremerhaven Zoo (Zoo am Meer) and other maritime-themed places.

External links 
 Bremerhaven Tourism Information

Bremerhaven